Magnus Sigurdsson (c. 1115 – 12 November 1139), also known as Magnus the Blind, was King of Norway (being Magnus IV) from 1130 to 1135 and again from 1137 to 1139. His period as king marked the beginning of the civil war era in Norway, which lasted until 1240.

Biography
Magnus was the son of King Sigurd I of Norway and Borghild Olavsdotter. When King Sigurd died in 1130, Magnus became king of Norway together with his uncle Harald Gille. After four years of uneasy peace, Magnus began to openly prepare for war on Harald. On August 9, 1134, he defeated Harald in the decisive Battle at Färlev near Färlev in Stångenäs herred in Båhuslen. Harald fled to Denmark. 

Against the advice of his councilors, Magnus disbanded his army and traveled to Bergen to spend the winter there. Harald then returned to Norway with a new army and the support of the Danish King Erik Emune.  Meeting little opposition, he reached Bergen before Christmas. Magnus had few men, and the city fell easily to Harald's army on January 7, 1135. Magnus was captured and dethroned. He was blinded, castrated and had one leg cut off. After this he was known as  Magnus the Blind (Magnus Sigurdsson den blinde). 

Magnus was  put in Nidarholm Abbey on the island of Munkholmen in Trondheim Fjord, where he spent some time as a monk. Harald Gille was killed in 1136 by Sigurd Slembe, another royal pretender who had himself proclaimed king in 1135. To back his claim, Sigurd Slembe brought Magnus back from the abbey and made him co-king. They decided to split up their forces, and Magnus headed for eastern Norway, where he had most popular support. There, he was defeated at the Battle of Minne by the forces of King Inge I. He then fled to Götaland and subsequently to Denmark, where he tried to get support for his cause. An attempted invasion of Norway by King Erik Emune of Denmark failed miserably.

Magnus then rejoined Sigurd Slembe's men, but they continued to have little support in Norway. After some time spent more like bandits than kings, they met the forces of King Inge I and King Sigurd II in a final battle on November 12, 1139. Magnus fell during the naval Battle of Holmengrå south of Hvaler in the Oslofjord. The loyal guard Reidar Grjotgardsson lifted his king at the final battle, but a spear impales them both. Magnus was buried in the Church of St. Hallvard in Oslo. There is a monument erected in memory of King Magnus the Blind at the  Storedal farm in Skjeberg in Østfold county.

Norwegian civil war
During the civil wars period of Norwegian history (1130–1240) there were several interlocked conflicts of varying scale and intensity. The background for these conflicts were the unclear Norwegian succession laws, social conditions and the struggle between church and king. There were then two main parties, firstly known by varying names or no names at all, but finally condensed into parties of Bagler and Birkebeiner. The rallying point regularly was a royal son, who was set up as the head figure of the party in question, to oppose the rule of king from the contesting party. ((Baglers and Birkebeiners did not exist before until about 30 years later, so this entry is not relevant to the subject matter, as it was a completely different war, in the same historical series of conflicts))

References

External links

 The saga of Magnus the Blinde and Harald Gille
 The saga of the sons of Harald Gille

1110s births
1139 deaths
12th-century Norwegian monarchs
House of Hardrada
Norwegian civil wars
Monarchs killed in action
Norwegian blind people
Blind royalty and nobility
Norwegian amputees
Castrated people
Norwegian military personnel killed in the Norwegian civil wars
Royalty and nobility with disabilities